Pingle Cutting is a  nature reserve north of Warboys in Cambridgeshire. It is managed by the Wildlife Trust for Bedfordshire, Cambridgeshire and Northamptonshire.

This former railway cutting has grassland with ox-eye daisy, salad burnet, wild carrot and hairy violet. There is also woodland with forest plants such as bluebells and dog's mercury. Over 50 bird and 300 moth species have been recorded.

There is access from Fenside Road.

References

Wildlife Trust for Bedfordshire, Cambridgeshire and Northamptonshire reserves